KSPJ-LP was a low-power independent television station in Pittsburg, Kansas, owned by Lamar Veasey. Although licensed for operation on UHF channel 59, it had been granted Special Temporary Authorization (STA) by the FCC to broadcast on channel 38 and had a construction permit to move operations to that channel.

History
The station was founded on July 26, 2002 as K59HT with an original construction permit issued by the FCC to Trinity Broadcasting Network. In February 2005, before the station began broadcasting, Trinity sold the construction permit to Brady Broadcasting, who changed the station's call letters to KSPJ-LP in March 2005. The station went on the air July 22, 2005, but immediately began causing problems, as its signal interfered with internet service from a local telephone co-op. Being a secondary service, KSPJ-LP was forced to find another frequency or to cease operations. The station applied to move to channel 38 on July 27, 2005 and then applied for an STA to operate on that frequency several days later. The FCC granted both requests, first the STA on August 24, 2005 which cleared the way for the station to move immediately, then the construction permit on October 31, 2005. On October 20, 2005, Brady Broadcasting sold the station to Lamar Veasey, one of its agents.

Effective January 1, 2012, the FCC cancelled the station's license and deleted the KSPJ-LP call sign from its database.

References

External links

Television stations in Kansas
Television channels and stations established in 2002
Defunct television stations in the United States
Television channels and stations disestablished in 2012
2002 establishments in Kansas
2012 disestablishments in Kansas
SPJ-LP
Pittsburg, Kansas